Rita M. Sambruna 
Commander OMRI  (Hon) is an Italian-American astrophysicist and is the Deputy Director of the Astrophysics Science Division at National Aeronautics and Space Administration's (NASA) Goddard Space Flight Center. From September 2022 to May 2023, she was the Acting Deputy Director of the Science Exploration Directorate at Goddard. Rita held the Clare Boothe Luce Professorship in Physics and Astronomy at George Mason University in 2000-2005.

Early life and education 
A native of Northern Italy, Rita attended the Liceo Classico A. Manzoni in Lecco, graduating with full marks.  Her Laurea degree in Physics is from the Universitá degli Studi di Milano (University of Milan). She received a MPhil and a PhD in Astrophysics from the International School for Advanced Studies (SISSA) with a thesis featuring the X-ray properties of extragalactic jets observed with ROSAT.

Career 
Rita held a postdoctoral position at the Space Telescope Science Institute (STScI), in Baltimore, MD, was an NRC Research Fellow at NASA's Goddard Space Flight Center, and a research associate at the Pennsylvania State University, in State College, Pennsylvania.  She held a CAREER award from the National Science Foundation.

From 2000-2005, Rita was the Clare Boothe Luce Professor in Physics and Astronomy at George Mason University, where she was part of the teaching faculty and where she mentored several undergraduate and graduate students in research projects. From 2005, she was a senior scientist at Goddard Space Flight Center with the Fermi group, conducting research on galaxies, jets, and black holes.

In 2010, she joined NASA Headquarters where she served as the Program Scientist for the Physics of the Cosmos Program (PCOS), oversaw the implementation of the Astrophysics Decadal Survey priorities for PCOS, and managed the Strategic Astrophysics Technology program. She was the Program Scientist for the Laser Interferometer Space Antenna (LISA) gravitational wave observatory. She served as Deputy Program Officer for the Astrophysics Data Archival Program (ADAP) and was the lead for Strategy for the Astrophysics Division.

Rita Sambruna is currently the Deputy Director of the Astrophysics Science Division at NASA's Goddard Space Flight Center.

Research 
Rita's astrophysics interests include the study of the condition of matter around supermassive black holes (jets, winds, warm absorbers), which she studied with X-ray and Gamma-ray observatories, including Chandra, XMM-Newton, and Fermi. Her research utilizes multi wavelength observations from Hubble and other space and ground-based telescopes, recently adding gravitational waves and other messengers for a broader and deeper understanding of the Universe.

Rita is a member of the American Astronomical Society (AAS), the High Energy Astrophysics Division of the AAS, the American Association for the Advancement of Science, and the American Physical Society.

Awards and honors
Rita received the NASA Exceptional Achievement Medal in 2019.  

She was elected Fellow of the American Physical Society in 2020, Fellow of the American Astronomical Society in 2021, and Fellow of the American Association for the Advancement of Science in 2022. 

Rita received the Robert H. Goddard Honor Award in 2022.  

In 2020, she was bestowed the honor of "Commendatore" (Commander) of the Order of Merit of the Italian Republic (OMRI). 

Rita was awarded Honorary Fellow of the Royal Astronomical Society in 2023.

Personal life
In her free time, Rita enjoys reading, riding horses, and teaching yoga. She is a certified RYT200 yoga teacher, with specialization in Yoga for Cancer. She is also trained in Applied Behavior Analysis and its applications to non-human animals.

References

External links
 

Living people
Year of birth missing (living people)
Place of birth missing (living people)
NASA people
NASA astrophysicists
Italian emigrants to the United States
Expatriate academics in the United States
Italian astrophysicists
Italian women physicists
American astronomers
20th-century Italian scientists
21st-century Italian scientists
20th-century American scientists
21st-century American scientists
Women astrophysicists
Fellows of the American Physical Society
Fellows of the American Astronomical Society
Fellows of the Royal Astronomical Society
Fellows of the American Association for the Advancement of Science
20th-century Italian women
21st-century Italian women